Tatiana Aleksandrovna Segina (born 20 January 1992, in Moscow) is a Russian archer who participated at the 2010 Summer Youth Olympics in Singapore. She won the bronze medal in the girls' event, defeating Mexican Mariana Avitia in the bronze medal match.

References 

Archers at the 2010 Summer Youth Olympics
Living people
Russian female archers
1992 births
20th-century Russian women
21st-century Russian women